Central Athens is one of the regional units of Greece. It is part of the region of Attica. The regional unit covers the central part of the agglomeration of Greater Athens.

Administration

As a part of the 2011 Kallikratis government reform, the regional unit Central Athens was created out of part of the former Athens Prefecture. It is subdivided into 8 municipalities. These are (number as in the map in the infobox):

Municipality of Athens (Dimos Athinas, 1)
Dafni-Ymittos (13)
Filadelfeia-Chalkidona (32)
Galatsi (11)
Ilioupoli (16)
Kaisariani (19)
Vyronas (10)
Zografou (15)

See also
List of settlements in Attica

References

 
Regional units of Attica
2011 establishments in Greece